Samuel Henchoz (13 November 1905 – 26 September 1976) was a Swiss sculptor. His work was part of the sculpture event in the art competition at the 1928 Summer Olympics.

References

1905 births
1976 deaths
20th-century Swiss sculptors
Swiss sculptors
Olympic competitors in art competitions
People from Montreux
20th-century Swiss male artists